Bae In-hyuk is a South Korean actor. He is known for his roles in television dramas such as My Roommate Is a Gumiho (2021), At a Distance, Spring Is Green (2021), and Cheer Up (2022).

Career  
In 2019, Bae debuted from the Web Film Love Buzz, which he starred together with Choi Ji-hui and Lee Han-ik. Later the same year, Bae joined the web drama When You Love Yourself 2, Triple Fling Season 2, Teacher, Would You Like to Date Me? and Kiss Scene in Yeonnamdong.

In 2020, Bae joined the web dramas XX and Kiss Goblin. Later, Bae made his small screen debut in the KBS drama Men Are Men  and made a short appearance in the JTBC drama Was It Love?.  and Bae joined the MBC drama The Spies Who Loved Me, and earned him a nomination for Best New Actor at the 2020 MBC Drama Awards.

In 2021, Bae participated in the tvN drama My Roommate Is a Gumiho. Bae later joined the KBS drama At A Distance, Spring Is Green. Later in July, Bae starred in the SBS drama Why Her, which aired in June of 2022.
 
In 2022, he starred in the SBS drama Cheer Up along with Han Ji-hyun, marking his first leading role. In October, the same month, he appeared in a cameo role as the son of actress Kim Hye-soo in the tvN drama Under The Queen's Umbrella

Filmography

Film

Television series

Web series

Music videos

Discography

Singles

Awards and nominations

References

External links
 
 

1997 births
Living people
21st-century South Korean male actors
South Korean male models
South Korean male television actors
South Korean male film actors
South Korean male web series actors
Seoul Institute of the Arts alumni